Kerschbaumer is a surname. Notable people with the surname include:

Gerhard Kerschbaumer (born 1991), Italian cross-country mountain biker
Gert Kerschbaumer (born 1945), Austrian historian
Konstantin Kerschbaumer (born 1992), Austrian footballer
Sepp Kerschbaumer (1913–1964), Italian separatist